Pittenger is a surname. Notable people with the surname include:

 Christopher Pittenger (born 1972), American psychiatrist and neuroscientist
 John Pittenger (1930–2009), American lawyer and politician
 L. A. Pittenger (1873–1953), American university president
 Norman Pittenger (1905–1997), American minister and theologian
 Pinky Pittenger (1899–1977), American baseball player
 Robert Pittenger (born 1948), American businessman and politician
 William Pittenger (1840–1904), Union Army soldier involved in the Great Locomotive Chase
 William Alvin Pittenger (1885–1951), American politician

Other uses
 Pittenger Cottage

See also
 Pittinger (surname)